The Southern Asia Division (SUD) of Seventh-day Adventists is headquartered at Hosur, Tamil Nadu, India. It heads the activities of the Seventh-day Adventist Churches and its affiliated bodies in India, Nepal and Bhutan.The Division has 1,143,346 members as of June 30, 2021.

History

The Adventist presence in India began in the early 1890s. Progress was slow. By 1904, there were about 130 Adventists there. The church began with book sales and pamphlet distribution. Early endeavors also included medical work, schools, care of orphans, and zenana work. At first, converts were of European heritage. There were some among the Indian population. One of them, A. C. Mookerjee. He was the grandson of William Carey's first convert.

In 1899 the mission director, D. A. Robinson, died from smallpox. William A. Spicer, at thirty-five years old, became the director. He was editor of the Oriental Watchman, the first Adventist periodical to be published in a completely non-Christian land. His leadership of the field was brief. In 1901, while attending the General Conference, Spicer was appointed as the secretary of the Foreign Mission Board located in the United States. John L. Shaw took over the leadership of the India field. Shaw came from the principalship of the church's South African school at Cape Town. With a few brief absences, he remained in India for twenty-three years.

The first of the Seventh-day Adventist Mission Quarterlies focused on the need for evangelism in India's major cities. Many people of India, still under British rule, spoke English. The 1912 Quarterly included a thrice repeated appeal from Shaw. He emphasised the need for missionaries who could preach in English.

In 1912, five Adventist missions formed the organisation of the India field: North India, West India, South India, Bengal and Burma. (See the map to the right.)

See also
Seventh-day Adventist Church in India
Seventh-day Adventist Church
List of Seventh-day Adventist hospitals
List of Seventh-day Adventist secondary schools
List of Seventh-day Adventist colleges and universities

References

Bibliography

History of the Seventh-day Adventist Church
Seventh-day Adventist Church in Asia